Leslie Merritt Hall (born November 15, 1981) is an American satirical rap artist and front-woman for the band Leslie and the LY's. She also operates a "gem sweater museum". She is best known for the YouTube hits like "How We Go Out" and "Tight Pants/Body Rolls". She is also currently a member of pop duo Neon & Nude.

Musical career

2000–05: Career beginnings, Leslie and the LY's, and Gold Pants
Hall began collecting gem sweaters in 2000 and, with the help of her fans, has since amassed over 400 different sweaters. Hall modeled these sweaters on the website gemsweater.com, garnering significant Internet traffic such that she was asked to appear on one of the final episodes of Unscrewed with Martin Sargent. In her 2004 TechTV interview, she stated that "about 65% of the comments" from the gemsweater.com message boards were related to a particular outfit of hers that included gold pants. In the summer of 2005, Hall received a $1,200 grant from the School of the Museum of Fine Arts to turn an RV into a mobile gemsweater museum. She decided to form a band, Leslie and the LY's, with former classmates, capitalizing on the popularity of her gem-laden sweaters and gold pants. In 2005, her band released their first album, Gold Pants.

2006–08: Door Man's Daughter and ceWEBrity
In 2006, Hall followed up with a self-released solo record, Door Man's Daughter, and toured the globe in support of it. She was named one of the "40 Greatest Internet Superstars" by VH1. Later in 2006, she appeared with fellow Internet personalities Jay Maynard, also known as "Tron Guy", and Randy Constan, a Peter Pan impersonator, to take a stand in the "battle over Internet freedom" in favor of network neutrality.

In 2007, she teamed up with Dungeon Majesty to create the video "Willow Don't Cry".

In 2008, she appeared with Tay Zonday in a commercial for Firefox web browser, singing a song titled "Firefox Users Against Boredom", a parody of "We Are the World". Leslie toured in support of her 2008 album, ceWEBrity.  She released a music video (and single) called "Zombie Killer" featuring Elvira, Mistress of the Dark on guest vocals, with cameos by Mark Borchardt and Mike Schank of American Movie fame.

2009–10: Back2Back Palz
Leslie's newest songs, as of 2009 were "Craft Talk" and "Tight Pants/Body Rolls", the latter of which has amassed over 24 million views on YouTube as of April 2022, making it Hall's most popular single on that service. The music video for "Tight Pants/Body Rolls" premiered January 17, 2009 at her show in Ames but has since been released alongside "Gravel In My Shoe". Her 2010 album, Back2Back Palz, features these two singles, as well as 11 country music inspired songs. She embarked on a US tour for the record in early 2010, with Christopher the Conquered serving as the opening act.

2011–14: Destination Friendship and Songs in the Key of Gold
In March 2011, Leslie and the LY's made appearances on MTN's Freaky Deeky where they performed "Power Cuddle" and "She's Got Pants", which were used to promote her then-upcoming fifth studio album. On May 8, 2011, Hall released the single "Hydrate Jirate", as the first single from her fifth studio album Destination Friendship, then released the album itself on December 1, 2011. Hall joined her band Leslie and the LY's to promote Destination Friendship in 2012. She uploaded a preview of the tour to her YouTube channel on February 8, 2012. On May 8, 2012, she released a music video for Destination Friendship's second single, "You're Not Taken?".

In 2013, Hall released the track "No Pants Policy", the first and only single from her sixth studio album, Songs in the Key of Gold. The album featured remixes from Titus Jones. She then released the album on December 14, 2013. She toured from January 2014 to March 2014 in the United States to promote the record.

2015–present: Neon & Nude 
Hall is now a member of pop duo Neon & Nude with former Leslie and the LY's member Kate Kennedy. They released three videos in 2013, 2015, and 2017: "Look in Love," "Kiss in the Dark," and "I'll Try To Improve." They released their debut studio album, Neon & Nude: Featuring the Feminine Gazes, on May 4, 2017.
In 2018 Hall began a live web show Yarn House Live being streamed via Facebook Live, and later YouTube Live.

Acting career
In April 2007, Hall appeared on MTV's Total Request Live.

On September 27, 2007, Hall appeared on the children's show Yo Gabba Gabba!, to perform in the "Dancey Dance" segment of an episode titled "Scary". She appeared again on October 21, 2008 in the season two episode titled "Differences". In October 2010, she began making guest appearances with the show's live touring act.

In 2013, Hall appeared in the episode "Summer Camp!" of The Hub series The Aquabats! Super Show!, a superhero-themed comedy from the creators of Yo Gabba Gabba!, where she played a gem sweater-wearing camp counselor named Jewel, who happens to be a shapeshifting were-ape. Hall appears in the feature film Hamlet A.D.D..

She also voiced "Big Dook" in Pickle and Peanut.

Personal life
Hall first began displaying herself in "strangely glamorous and unflattering ways" while attending Ames High School in Iowa. During her senior year, she entered the homecoming parade, as part of a prom queen campaign, donning a sparkling pink Goodwill gown, neck brace, and a tiara (worn by her mother, who was crowned Miss Auburn, Nebraska in 1970). The next day, her effort made the front page of the local newspaper. Her campaign was a success as she was later crowned queen. After graduating from high school, Hall moved to Boston, Massachusetts to attend the School of the Museum of Fine Arts for four years and graduated in May 2005. Hall has an older brother who goes by the pseudonym "Arecee" who helps produce some of Leslie's records and does his own hip hop music.

Discography

Albums

Singles

Filmography

Film

Television

References

 "Leslie Hall, gemsweater.com", Unscrewed with Martin Sargent, TechTV. 2004.
 Sellards, Jason. "Beautiful People 2006: Leslie Hall". Papermag. April 4, 2006.
 Marusa, Danielle. "Do the right bling: Leslie Hall's gem sweaters are truly outrageous". Bust Magazine. February–March 2006. (scan)
 Riggs, Jonathan.  "Beat Dazzler". Instinct Magazine. January 2006. (scan)
 Babayan, Siran. "Shine On You Crazy, Gem Sweater". LA Weekly. September 13, 2006. Retrieved June 8, 2022
 VH1 Television Show. ""40 Greatest Internet Superstars - #20 Leslie Hall". VH1. March 2007.
 Hoff, A. Ashley. "Leslie Hall & The World of Internet Camp". The Advocate. March 19, 2007. Retrieved June 8, 2022

External links
 
 
 
 

1981 births
American comedy musicians
Outsider musicians
Midwest hip hop musicians
Iowa culture
American Internet celebrities
American novelty song performers
Living people
People from Ames, Iowa
Rappers from Iowa
Ames High School alumni
21st-century American rappers
21st-century American comedians